Janet Cathryn Tedstone (born 12 September 1959) is an English former cricketer who played as a right-handed batter and right-arm medium bowler. She appeared in 12 Test matches and 38 One Day Internationals for England between 1979 and 1992. She played domestic cricket for West Midlands and Yorkshire.

References

External links
 

1959 births
Living people
England women Test cricketers
England women One Day International cricketers
Sportspeople from Southport
West Midlands women cricketers
Yorkshire women cricketers